The Escape is a 1939 American crime film directed by Ricardo Cortez and written by Robert Ellis and Helen Logan. The film stars Kane Richmond, Amanda Duff, June Gale, Edward Norris, Henry Armetta and Frank Reicher. The film was released on October 6, 1939, by 20th Century Fox.

Plot

Cast        
Kane Richmond as Eddie Farrell
Amanda Duff as Juli Peronni
June Gale as Annie Qualen
Edward Norris as Louie Peronni
Henry Armetta as Guiseppi Peronni
Frank Reicher as Dr. Shumaker
Scotty Beckett as Willie Rogers
Leona Roberts as Aunt Mamie Qualen
Rex Downing as Tommy Rogers
Jimmy Butler as Jim Rogers
Roger McGee as Swat
Richard Lane as David Clifford
Jack Carson as Chet Warren
Matt McHugh as Pete 
Helen Ericson as Helen Gardner

References

External links 
 

1939 films
20th Century Fox films
American action films
1930s action films
American black-and-white films
Films directed by Ricardo Cortez
1930s English-language films
1930s American films